Anne Ryan (1889–1954) was an American Abstract Expressionist artist associated with the New York School. Her first contact with the New York City avant-garde came in 1941 when she joined the Atelier 17, a famous printmaking workshop that the British artist Stanley William Hayter had established in Paris in the 1930s and then brought to New York when France fell to the Nazis. The great turning point in Ryan's development occurred after the war, in 1948. She was 57 years old when she saw the collages of Kurt Schwitters at the Rose Fried Gallery, in New York City, in 1948. She right away dedicated herself to this newly discovered medium. Since Anne Ryan was a poet, according to Deborah Solomon, in Kurt Schwitters’s  collages “she recognized the visual equivalent of her sonnets – discrete images packed together in an extremely compressed space.” When six years later Ryan died, her work in this medium numbered over 400 pieces.

Biography
Anne Ryan was born in Hoboken, New Jersey in 1889. Both her parents died when Ryan was in her early teens, and she attended the Academy of Saint Elizabeth convent for both high school and early college. She left the school her junior year to marry attorney William McFadden; they separated in 1923. During this time she frequented art and literary circles in New York City's Greenwich Village neighborhood, and published a novel, Raquel, as well as a volume of poetry, Lost Hills. In 1931 and 1932 she lived in Majorca and then Paris. When she returned to the United States and settled on West Fourth Street in New York City, the cultural community there was rapidly galvanizing, attracting artists and writers of all backgrounds through the Works Progress Administration and generating new styles that challenged the Regionalism and Social Realism for which the U.S. was known. She began to paint in 1938 and had her first solo exhibition in 1941 at The Pinacoteca on Lexington Avenue. After seeing Kurt Schwitters' collages shown at the Rose Fried Gallery in 1948, she was struck by "the abstract form and tactile quality, at how much power and complexity there could be on so small a scale." She seized on the idea of debris and made her first collage from paper and fabric scraps that very evening, continuing mostly in this mode until her death in 1954 in Morristown, New Jersey. She was interred at Gate of Heaven Cemetery in East Hanover, New Jersey.

Her image is included in the iconic 1972 poster  Some Living American Women Artists by Mary Beth Edelson.

Artistic and literary work 
For Ryan, the relationship between artmaking and writing was very permeable, though she favored the latter for most of her life. She wrote a series of poems in the late 1930s and 40s called Lines to a Young Painter, and her circle of friends included artists and writers of all kinds. Her artistic work first took the form of printmaking—she made prints with Stanley William Hayter at Atelier 17, a hub for the American and European avant-garde—followed by oil painting, and by the mid-1940s she was designing costumes and backdrops for ballet performances.

It was in collage, though, that Ryan found her primary voice. She incorporated all kinds of papers and textiles into her collage compositions, including silk, netting, handmade rag paper, and Japanese rice paper. Most were small in scale, averaging roughly eight by six inches. Many of the works were mounted on handmade paper by Douglas Morse Howell, who frequently collaborated with New York artists in the 1950s and 60s and often made paper from re-purposed textile fibers like blue jeans, or from flax grown in his backyard. Ryan's collages distilled and expanded upon this sensibility by juxtaposing small squares of different materials against one another to highlight the distinct textures and densities of each. Their small scale and her use of pastel colors provoked varying critical responses in the early 1950s; many writers commented on the works' "feminine" qualities.

Ryan had three exhibitions of her work at the Betty Parsons Gallery in the 1950s that solidified her reputation in the art world. Parsons was well known for showing abstract artists like Barnett Newman and Agnes Martin. After her death in 1954, an exhibition of her collage was shown at the Brooklyn Museum and traveled to the National Collection of Fine Arts in Washington, DC; the Art Museum of South Texas, Corpus Christi; and the New Jersey State Museum in Trenton. Her daughter Elizabeth McFadden is also an artist.

Selected solo exhibitions:
 1941: The Pinacotheca, NY (paintings); Marquie Gallery, NY (prints)
 1942: New York School for Social Research, NY (prints)
 1946: The Philadelphia Art Alliance, PA (prints)
 1947: Cranbrook Academy of Art, Bloomfield, MI (prints)
 1948: Gallery Denise Severin, Paris (first European exhibition of prints)
 1950, 1954, 1970: Betty Parsons Gallery, NYC (collages)
 1955: Betty Parsons Gallery, NYC (Memorial exhibition, paintings and collages)
 1957: Kraushaar Gallery, NYC (Memorial exhibition, prints)
 1974: Marlborough Gallery, NYC
 1991: Anne Ryan. Collages from Three Museums, Washburn Gallery, NYC
 1962-1963: New England preparatory schools and the Museum of Fine Arts (MFA) - Boston, MA (circulating exhibition)
 1974: circ. exhibition Brooklyn Museum, NY and Smithsonian American Art Museum, Washington, D.C. (collages)
 1974, 1977: Marlborough Gallery, NY (collages)
 1979 Walker Art Center, Minneapolis, Minnesota (collages)
 1979, 1981: André Emmerich Gallery, NY (collages)
 1979-1080: Yale University Art Gallery, New Haven, CT (collages)
 1980: Museum of Fine Arts, Houston, TX (collages)
 1985, 1989, 1991: Washburn Gallery, NY

Selected group exhibitions:
 1944: Hayter & Atelier XVII, Museum of Modern Art (MoMA), NY
 1945: National Exhibition of Prints, 1945, Library of Congress, Washington, D.C.
 1947-1953: Brooklyn Museum of Art Print Annuals, NY
 1947: 45th Annual Watercolor and Print Exhibition, Pennsylvania Academy of Fine Arts, PA
 1950: John Stephan/Anne Ryan (collages), Betty Parsons Gallery, NYC
 1951: Abstract Painting and Sculpture in America, Museum of Modern Art, NYC; Some American Prints, 1945–1959, Museum of Modern Art, NYC and The Whitney Museum of American Art, NYC
 1951, Ninth Street Show
 1951, 1953, 1954: The Whitney Museum of American Art, Annuals and Biennials, NYC
 1954: New York Painting and Sculpture Annual, Stable Gallery, NYC
 1954-1955: International Color Woodcuts, Victoria and Albert Museum, London, England
 1961-1962: The Art of Assemblage, The Museum of Modern Art, NYC circ.
 1965-1967: American Collages, The Museum of Modern Art, NYC circ.
 1974: Brooklyn Museum, NY
 1975: Group Show: Collage, Betty Parsons Gallery, NYC
 1976: 30th Anniversary Show, Betty Parsons Gallery, NYC

Public collections
 Addison Gallery of American Art, Andover, Mass.
 Brooklyn Museum of Art, New York
 College Art Gallery, State University College, New Paltz, N.Y.
 Hirshhorn Museum and Sculpture Garden, Washington, D.C.
 Lamont Gallery, Phillips Exeter Academy, Exeter, N.H.
 Metropolitan Museum of Art, New York
 Minneapolis Institute of Art
 Montclair Art Museum, New Jersey
 Museum of Fine Arts, Houston, Texas
 National Gallery of Art, Washington, D.C.
 Newark Museum, New Jersey
 New Jersey State Museum, Trenton
 Palmer Museum of Art, State College, P.A.
 Rhode Island School of Design Museum, Providence, R.I.
 Wadsworth Atheneum, Hartford, Conn.
 Walker Art Center, Minneapolis
 Whitney Museum of American Art, New York
 Williams College Museum of Art - Williamstown, Mass.
 Yale University Art Gallery, New Haven, Conn.
 Museum of Modern Art, New York.

See also
 Art movement
 Action painting

References

Bibliography
 Stuart Preston, Artists of Personal Vision, The New York Times, April 10, 1955 Section 2, p. 11
 Fairfield Porter, "Reviews and Previews," Art News, vol. 56, Dec. 1957, p. 11 - Anne Ryan, Darkest Leaf, Boteghe Oscure, vol. 22, 1958 (story published posthumously).
 Donald Windham, A note on Anne Ryan, Boteghe Oscure, vol. 22, 1958, pp. 267–271.
 Hilton Kramer, Anne Ryan: Bigness on a Small Scale, New York Times, February 3, 1968, p. 25, ills.
 John Ashberry, A Place for Everything, Art News, vol.69, March 1970, p. 32
 Carter Ratcliff, New York, Art International, vol.14, Summer 1970, p. 141
 Piri Halasz, "Trenton Exhibit Celebrates the Wonders of Collage," The New York Times, Nov 17, 1974, p. 33, B&W of Ryan

Books
 Marika Herskovic, New York School Abstract Expressionists Artists Choice by Artists, (New York School Press, 2000.) . p. 18; p. 38; p. 318-321

External links
 Anne Ryan papers, 1922-1968. Smithsonian Institution Research Information System; Archival, Manuscript and Photographic Collections.
 Anne Ryan at the Smithsonian American Art Museum, Washington D.C.
 Anne Ryan at the Collection of Walker Art Center, Minneapolis, MN

1889 births
1954 deaths
Abstract expressionist artists
American women painters
Modern painters
Artists from New York (state)
Artists from Hoboken, New Jersey
20th-century American painters
20th-century American women artists
American women printmakers
20th-century American printmakers
Atelier 17 alumni
Burials at Gate of Heaven Cemetery (East Hanover, New Jersey)